B. splendens may refer to:
 Beryx splendens, the splendid alfonsino, a fish species found around the world at depths of between 25 and 1,300 m
 Betta splendens, the Siamese fighting fish, betta or simply fighter, a popular freshwater aquarium fish species
 Brochis splendens, the emerald catfish, emerald brochis, emerald cory, green catfish, or shortbody catfish, a tropical freshwater fish species
 Buprestis splendens, a beetle species found from Western Europe to Russia

See also